Luc is a commune in the Lozère department in southern France.

The village of Luc is overlooked by the castle-ruin of Château de Luc. The Robert Louis Stevenson Trail (GR 70), a popular long-distance path, runs past the chateau and through the village.

See also
Communes of the Lozère department

References

External links

Luc in Lozere (French)
 Regordane Info - The independent portal for The Regordane Way or St Gilles Trail, which passes through Luc. (in English and French)

Communes of Lozère